Molen Hoogland is a Hollow Post mill in Goutum, Friesland, Netherlands which was built in 2004. The mill is listed as a Rijksmonument, number 24521.

History

The mill was originally built in the 18th century at Wirdum to drain the Wirdumer Nieuwland polder, forming a pair with the Kramersmolen. The mill was restored in 1971. The mill was restored in 1968-69. On 23 October 1986, the mill was sold to Stichting De Fryske Mole. In 1995, it was moved to Zwette, along with Kramersmolen. On 21 April 1999, the mill was burnt down. The cause was probably arson. A new site was sought at Goutum. The restored mill was officially opened in 2003.

Description

Molen Hoogland is what the Dutch describe as an spinnenkop. It is a hollow post mill on a single storey square roundhouse. The mill is winded by tailpole and winch. The roundhouse and mill body are covered in vertical boards, while the roof of the mill is boarded horizontally. The sails are Common sails. The sails are carried on a wooden  windshaft. The windshaft also carries the brake wheel which has 33 cogs. This drives the wallower (19 cogs) at  the top of the upright shaft. At the bottom of the upright shaft, the crown wheel, which has 28 cogs drives a gearwheel with 27 cogs on the axle of the Archimedes' screw. The axle of the Archimedes' screw is  diameter. It is inclined at 25°. Each revolution of the screw lifts  of water.

Public access
Kramersmolen is open by appointment.

References

Windmills in Friesland
Windmills completed in 2003
Hollow post mills in the Netherlands
Windpumps in the Netherlands
Rijksmonuments in Friesland